Frank Zane (born June 28, 1942) is a retired American professional bodybuilder and author. He is a three-time Mr. Olympia, and his physique is considered one of the greatest in the history of bodybuilding due to his meticulous focus on symmetry and proportion. He was inducted in the IFBB Hall of Fame in 1999.

Biography
Zane was born in Kingston, Pennsylvania on June 28, 1942. He started bodybuilding as a teenager after reading Muscle Magazine. In 1964, he received a Bachelor of Science from Wilkes University. For 13 years, he taught mathematics and chemistry while living in Florida and California. He also taught mathematics and chemistry at Watchung Hills Regional High School (in New Jersey) for the 1965–1966 school year. He earned a bachelor's degree in psychology from California State University, Los Angeles in 1977. Zane was awarded a master's degree in experimental psychology from California State University, San Bernardino in 1992.

Bodybuilding career 
Zane is a three-time Mr. Olympia (1977 to 1979). His reign represented a shift in emphasis from mass to aesthetics. Zane's physique featured the second-thinnest waistline of all the Mr. Olympias (after Sergio Oliva), with his wide shoulders making for a distinctive V-taper. He was given the nickname "The Chemist" due to his Bachelor of Science degree and, as he puts it: "Back in the day I took a lot of supplements and tons of amino acids. Still do. But back then it was pretty unusual. That's how I got the nickname The Chemist."

He famously trained with light weights which saw him to many victories, but Joe Weider urged him to train with heavier weights. Zane then found the size necessary for success at the Olympia. After his three consecutive Mr. Olympia titles came the 1980 Mr. Olympia. Shortly before the competition he suffered a poolside accident in his home and he lost  of muscle mass. This saw the end to his reign, as Arnold Schwarzenegger controversially placed at the top of the podium in his comeback, with Zane in third.

Zane is one of only three men to have defeated Schwarzenegger (with Chester Yorton and Sergio Oliva) in a bodybuilding contest and one of the very few Mr. Olympia winners under . Overall, he competed for over 20 years (retiring after the 1983 Mr. Olympia) and won Mr. America, Mr. Universe, Mr. World, and Mr. Olympia during his career.

In 1985, Frank and his wife Christine owned and operated "Zane Haven" in Palm Springs, California where they conducted one-on-one sessions with clients who wished to possess a symmetrical physique. Today, the Zanes live in San Diego, California, and his learning center is now called "Zane Experience". He is the founder of Zane Gallery in Laguna Beach, CA which features bodybuilding art and photography and is dedicated to bringing Golden Era Bodybuilding back into the mainstream. In addition to this, he operates a commerce site selling books, supplements and training equipment.

In 1994, Zane was inducted into the Joe Weider Hall of Fame. Since 1998, Zane has written a newsletter entitled Frank Zane Newsletter, that provides the latest information in all aspects of bodybuilding. He received the Arnold Schwarzenegger Lifetime Achievement Award at the 2003 Arnold Classic for his dedication and longtime support of the sport.

In 2005, Zane played the IFBB Announcer and worked as the consulting producer in the movie "See Arnold Run". As of 2006, Zane currently runs his own website, and appears at seminars and book signings. In 2011 Frank Zane appeared in the documentary Challenging Impossibility describing the weightlifting odyssey of spiritual teacher and peace advocate Sri Chinmoy. The film was an official selection of the 2011 Tribeca Film Festival.

In June 2020, Frank Zane began filming a feature documentary on his life directed and produced by filmmaker Alex Ardenti.

Bodybuilding titles 
 1961 Mr. Pennsylvania (17th place)
 1962 Mr. Keystone (Winner)
 1963 Mr. Keystone (2nd)
 1965 Mr. Sunshine State (Winner)
 1965 IFBB Mr. Universe (1st, Medium Height category)
 1966 IFBB Mr. America (1st, Medium)
 1967 IFBB Mr. America (1st, Medium)
 1967 IFBB Mr. Universe (3rd, Tall)
 1968 IFBB Mr. America (Winner)
 1968 IFBB Mr. Universe (Winner)
 1970 NABBA Mr. Universe (Winner)
 1971 NABBA Pro Mr. Universe (1st, Short)
 1972 NABBA Pro Mr. Universe (Winner)
 1972 IFBB Mr. Olympia (Under 200 lbs, 4th)
 1973 IFBB Mr. Olympia (Under 200 lbs, did not place)
 1974 IFBB Mr. Olympia (Under 200 lbs, 2nd)
 1975 IFBB Mr. Olympia (Under 200 lbs, 4th)
 1976 IFBB Mr. Olympia (Under 200 lbs, 2nd)
 1977 IFBB Mr. Olympia (Under 200 lbs & Overall Winner)
 1978 IFBB Mr. Olympia (Under 200 lbs & Overall Winner)
 1979 IFBB Mr. Olympia (Under 200 lbs & Overall Winner)
 1980 IFBB Mr. Olympia (3rd, after suffering a near-fatal injury at his home, requiring lengthy hospitalization)
 1981 IFBB Mr. Olympia – did not compete (boycotted the Mr Olympia contest after the controversial 1980 contest)
 1982 IFBB Mr. Olympia (2nd)
 1983 IFBB Mr. Olympia (4th), after suffering another accident on his bicycle, requiring extensive shoulder surgery shortly after the contest)

Competitive stats
 Height: 
 Contest weight:

Bibliography 
 The Zane Way to a Beautiful Body (1979)
 Super Bodies in 12 Weeks (1982)
 Zane Nutrition (1986)
 Fabulously Fit Forever (1992)
 Fabulously Fit Forever Expanded (1996)
 Frank Zane: Mind, Body, Spirit (1997)
 Frank Zane Training Manual (2005)
 The High Def Handbook (2008)
 The Mind in Bodybuilding (2009)
 91 Day Wonder Body (2016)
 91 Day Wonder Abs (2017)
 Zane Bodybuilding Manual (2018)

References

External links
 

| colspan = 3 align = center | Mr. Olympia 
|- 
| width = 30% align = center | Preceded by:Franco Columbu
| width = 40% align = center | First (1977)
| width = 30% align = center | Succeeded by:himself
|- 
| width = 30% align = center | Preceded by:himself
| width = 40% align = center | Second (1978)
| width = 30% align = center | Succeeded by:himself
|- 
| width = 30% align = center | Preceded by:himself
| width = 40% align = center | Third (1979)
| width = 30% align = center | Succeeded by:Arnold Schwarzenegger

1942 births
American bodybuilders
Living people
People associated with physical culture
People from Kingston, Pennsylvania
Professional bodybuilders
American religious skeptics
Devotees of Sri Chinmoy
Strength training writers
Schoolteachers from California
Schoolteachers from Florida